Goldstone is a surname. It is often the anglicized form of the Jewish surname Goldstein. Notable people with the surname include:

Anthony Goldstone (1944—2017), English pianist
Basil Goldstone (1909–1988), British Liberal Party activist
Blanche Goldstone (1914–2002)[, American actress, stage name Tracey Roberts
Sir Frank Walter Goldstone (1870—1955), British teacher, trade unionist and politician
Gary Goldstone (born 1976), South African football defender 
Henry Goldstone (before 1498—1547)), English politician
Jack Goldstone (born 1953), American political scientist and sociologist
James Goldstone,  (1931—99), American director
Jeffrey Goldstone (born 1933), British-American theoretical physicist
Jules Goldstone (1900—80), American entertainment attorney 
Michael Goldstone, American music industry executive
Richard Goldstone (born 1938), South African judge and international war crimes prosecutor
Robert Goldstone, American professor of psychology
Steven Goldstone (born 1946), American manager of investment firm

See also
 Gouldstone